Jürgen Lässig (born February 25, 1943 in Tuttlingen) is a German former racing driver.

Lässig began competing in endurance sports car racing, often World Sportscar Championship races in the early 1980s for Obermaier Racing and drove in several 24 Hours of Le Mans races. He and the Kremer Racing team were the winners of the 1995 24 Hours of Daytona. He retired after the 1997 24 Hours of Le Mans driving for Kremer.

24 Hours of Le Mans results

External links
Profile at Driver Database

1943 births
Living people
People from Tuttlingen
Sportspeople from Freiburg (region)
People from the Free People's State of Württemberg
German racing drivers
24 Hours of Le Mans drivers
24 Hours of Daytona drivers
Racing drivers from Baden-Württemberg
World Sportscar Championship drivers

Porsche Motorsports drivers